The Mt. Zion Christian Church in Richmond, Kentucky, was completed in 1852 and added to the National Register of Historic Places in 1989.

Church attendees included slaveholders and their slaves.

It has cannonballs embedded in its south wall, from the American Civil War's Battle of Richmond on August 29 and 30, 1862.  The church was used as a hospital.

It is a brick structure, with brick laid in double-stretcher Flemish bond and in American bond.  Its facade has three pilasters supporting an entablature which gives a pedimented appearance, consistent with Greek Revival style, but the church's Jack arches are elements of Federal style.

References

Churches completed in 1852
19th-century churches in the United States
Churches in Madison County, Kentucky
Churches on the National Register of Historic Places in Kentucky
National Register of Historic Places in Madison County, Kentucky
1852 establishments in Kentucky
Greek Revival church buildings in Kentucky
Richmond, Kentucky